Kovaleski is a surname of Polish origin. The standard Polish spelling is Kowalewski. Notable people with the name include:

Fred Kovaleski (1924–2018), American tennis player, spy, and businessman
Mike Kovaleski (born 1965), American former football linebacker
Serge F. Kovaleski (born 1961), American investigative journalist, son of Fred
Tony Kovaleski (born 1959), American investigative journalist

See also
 
 Kovalevsky, a Russian surname
 Kowalewski, a Polish surname
 Kowalski, a Polish surname

Polish-language surnames